North Solomons can refer to three overlapping sets of Melanesian islands in the Western Pacific:
 North Solomon Islands refers to the former colony of the German Solomon Islands
 North Solomons Province, a province of Papua New Guinea replaced by the Autonomous Region of Bougainville
 Republic of the North Solomons in part of the above, which unilaterally declared its independence but was reabsorbed into Papua New Guinea